Icimauna aysa is a species of beetle in the family Cerambycidae. It was described by Martins and Galileo in 1991. It is known from Panama and Costa Rica.

References

Hemilophini
Beetles described in 1991